César Alexis Canario (born 18 August 1987) is an Argentinian football forward playing for Juventud Pinulteca F.C. from the Primera División de Guatemala.

Born in Santa Fe, Argentina, he started playing with the local club Club Atlético Colón in 2004.  Colon sent him in 2009 abroad on loan to Paraguayan Primera División side Club 2 de Mayo. Next, he moved back to Argentina but this time went on loan to Sportivo Italiano, a club which had just been promoted to the Primera B Nacional league.  After returning to CA Colon and playing with their reserves team, in January 2011 he moved to Europe and signed with Bosnian Premier League side FK Leotar.  In summer 2011 he will leave Leotar and return to Argentina to play with Huracán de Tres Arroyos and, after 6 months, he will move abroad again, this time to Ecuador to join Espoli.

References

External sources
 alexiscanario.blogspot.pt
 Profile and stats from Argentina at BDFA.com.ar

1987 births
Living people
Footballers from Santa Fe, Argentina
Argentine footballers
Argentine expatriate footballers
Association football forwards
Club Atlético Colón footballers
2 de Mayo footballers
Expatriate footballers in Paraguay
Sportivo Italiano footballers
FK Leotar players
Expatriate footballers in Bosnia and Herzegovina
Huracán de Tres Arroyos footballers
C.D. ESPOLI footballers
Expatriate footballers in Ecuador
Deportivo Laferrere footballers
Huracán de Comodoro Rivadavia footballers